The Gozo representative football team represents the island of Gozo, Malta, in football. It is organised by the Gozo Football Association and its home stadium is the Gozo Stadium.

It is not affiliated with FIFA or UEFA and therefore is not eligible to enter either the World Cup or European Championship. The Gozo representative football team, however, competed in the 2009 Viva World Cup and hosted the subsequent edition in the following year. As of 2018, Gozo  has also participated in the last four editions of the UEFA Regions' Cup, on top of their appearance in the inaugural edition in 1999. Occasionally, the Gozo representative football team also plays friendlies against football clubs, particularly those from the mainland. As of 2022, Gozo joined the Island Games Association, this made the Gozo representative football team eligible to participate in the biannual multi-sport event's football tournament.

History

Historical records suggest that a team representing the island of Gozo had already played a couple of matches way before the turn of the millennium. Indeed, during the 1970s a side representing Gozo was invited to join in the Independence celebrations and play 2 friendly matches against local sides. Other historical records indicate that a Gozitan team might have been involved in more matches during this period.

The Gozo Football Association's decision to organise Gozo F.C. and have it play in the Maltese football league system might be the reason behind the lengthy hiatus of the Gozo representative national team. Indeed, the next known Gozitan appearance came in 1999, when a selection representing Gozo played in first edition of the UEFA Regions Cup. Ten years after, specifically in 2009, the Gozo representative football team debuted in the Viva World Cup. In the following year, Gozo hosted the 2010 edition of the Viva World Cup and therefore, once again, Gozo had the opportunity to participate in the said Cup. Overall, Gozo's performance was disappointing as they finished at the bottom of their group but the team could find solace in the fact that the win against Provence was their first ever win on the field against international opponents. Gozo's appearance in the 2010 Viva World Cup was, however, their last appearance in the now-defunct competition.

That said, the launching of the Gozo Cup during the same year presented an opportunity for the representative side to play friendly matches against Maltese football clubs. The Gozo Cup ran for four consecutive years and during the intervening period Gozo also played a number of friendlies, including the famous 17–1 victory against the Raetia national football team in Xewkija. Since then, Gozo's appearances have been limited to the UEFA Regions' Cup. Indeed, the Gozitan representative football team appearance in the 2017 edition of the bi-annual UEFA Regions Cup marked Gozo's participation in, and hosting of, the tournament for the third edition running.

Tournament records

At VIVA World Cup

At UEFA Regions' Cup

Match history

Selected international matches

UEFA Regions' Cup

Selected non-international matches

Notable players

  Thiago Melo dos Santos - played for professional team Chania

References

External links 
 Official site of the Gozo Football Association
 2017 UEFA Regions Cup – Profile

Football in Gozo
European national and official selection-teams not affiliated to FIFA